This is a list of players who have played at least one game for the New York Americans (1925–1941) and Brooklyn Americans (1941–42) of the National Hockey League (NHL). This list does not include players for the Quebec Bulldogs (1919–20) and Hamilton Tigers (1920–1925).



Key
  Hockey Hall of Famer

The "Seasons" column lists the first year of the season of the player's first game and the last year of the season of the player's last game. For example, a player who played one game in the 2000–2001 season would be listed as playing with the team from 2000–2001, regardless of what calendar year the game occurred within.

Skaters

Goaltenders

See also
List of NHL players

References
New York Americans all time roster

New York Americans